The Limerick Senior Hurling Championship is an annual club competition between the top hurling clubs in Limerick. The winners of the Limerick Championship qualify to represent their county in the Munster Club Championship, the winners of which go on to the All-Ireland Senior Club Hurling Championship. 

The winners of the 2006 championship were Bruree who defeated firm favourites, Patrickswell in the final on a scoreline of 1-16 to 1-15.

Overview

Sixteen teams contest the Limerick County Championship.  These teams are:
City : Monaleen, Na Piarsaigh, Patrickswell.
East : Ahane, Doon, Murroe-Boher.
South: Bruree, Croom, Dromin-Athlacca, Garryspillane,  Kilmallock, Knockainey.
West : Adare, Granagh-Ballingarry, Tournafulla, Killeedy,

First round

Second round

Winners Group

Losers Group

Relegation Playoffs
The Losers of these matches will play Intermediate Hurling in 2007. There will be 15 teams playing senior hurling in 2007 plus a divisional team. The Knockainey - Dromin Athlacca match may be called off for some time due to the shock death of the Knockainey full back William O'Brien to Sudden Adult Death Syndrome the night before the proposed meeting of the two clubs.

Third round

Quarter finals

Semi finals

Final

Championship statistics

Miscellaneous

 Bruree end a 113 year gap to win the first time since 1893.

References

Limerick Senior Hurling Championship
Limerick Senior Hurling Championship